Welton John "Jack" Harris (September 29, 1902 – December 28, 1973) was a player in the National Football League.

Harris was born on September 29, 1902 in Jackson, Michigan. He attended high school in Racine, Wisconsin and played at the collegiate level at the University of Wisconsin.

Harris played with the Green Bay Packers for two seasons.
He was captain of the 1924 Wisconsin team.
In his final game for Wisconsin, against Chicago, he gained more yards rushing, 193, than the whole Chicago team.

See also
List of Green Bay Packers players

References

Sportspeople from Jackson, Michigan
Sportspeople from Racine, Wisconsin
Players of American football from Michigan
Players of American football from Wisconsin
Green Bay Packers players
Wisconsin Badgers football players
1902 births
1973 deaths
Sportspeople from the Milwaukee metropolitan area